Matilda of England or Empress Matilda (1102–1167) was the daughter and dispossessed heiress of Henry I.
Matilda of England may also refer to:
Matilda of Flanders (c.1031 – 1083), Queen consort of England, consort to William I
Matilda of Scotland (1080–1118), Queen consort of England, consort to Henry I
Matilda of Boulogne (1105?–1152), Queen consort of England, consort to Stephen of England
Matilda of England, Duchess of Saxony (1156–1189), daughter of Henry II of England

See also
Matilda FitzRoy (disambiguation)